The John S. Thompsonbrug is a bridge over the Maas River between Grave and Nederasselt in the Netherlands.

Construction
The bridge was built in 1929 as part of the main road between 's-Hertogenbosch and Nijmegen. It still carries that road, now signed provincial route N324.

Capture by Allies during World War II
In 1944, as a first lieutenant, John S. Thompson led his men during an air raid as part of Operation Market Garden. The light in the jump bay of the platoon's C-47 Skytrain came on later than expected, moving their landing zone from its intended location near Grave, North Brabant; the plane was passing over buildings when the paratroopers were signalled to leave the aircraft, and Thompson decided to wait until reaching several approaching fields.

Thompson led his platoon in an attack against the nearby bridge spanning the Maas River, which was defended by German forces supplemented by two 20 mm flak guns, one on the near side of the bridge and one across the river. The platoon opened fire on the German forces, killing four. Two trucks of German soldiers arrived on the scene, but they "showed no desire to fight... [and] ran away". Thompson's platoon destroyed "electrical equipment and cables that they expected were hooked up to demolitions", and their bazooka operator destroyed the nearer flak gun, permitting the establishment of a roadblock on the bridge while waiting for the remainder of the 82nd Airborne.

Re-naming
Having had no official name, the bridge was renamed in 2004 to John S. Thompsonbrug in honor of Thompson's platoon's capture. Many veterans of World War II, as well as Thompson's wife, attended the ceremony.

Gallery

References
Inline citations

Bibliography

Bridges over the Meuse
Road bridges in the Netherlands
Steel bridges in the Netherlands
Bridges in Gelderland
Bridges in North Brabant
Rijksmonuments in Gelderland
Rijksmonuments in North Brabant
Buildings and structures in Land van Cuijk
Transport in Land van Cuijk
Heumen